Commodore Hub E. Isaacks and O'Leary Trophies are the main sailing trophies awarded at the Open Snipe World Championships. The Commodore Hub E. Isaacks Trophy is awarded to the fleet of the winning skipper, while the O’Leary Trophy is awarded to the person who crews for the winning skipper in the majority of races sailed in the World Championships.

Another two perpetual trophies are presented in the championship: The Earl Elms Perpetual Trophy is awarded to the fleet of the winning skipper of the final race of the World Championship, and the Bibi Juetz Perpetual Trophy to the highest placing
mixed team.

This competition is held every two years in the odd numbered years since the year 1949. Previously, it was held every year since 1934. It is named after Hub E. Isaacs, of Dallas, Texas, first commodore of the Snipe Class International Racing Association (SCIRA), who donated the trophy.

The O'Leary Trophy is awarded since 1961 and it was donated by Cathy O’Leary y Helen O’Leary Hall.

Winners

^Crew did not receive the O'Leary Trophy because it was not established yet

References

External links 
SCIRA

Snipe World Championships